Henry Charles Bailey Jr. (born February 28, 1973) is a former professional American football wide receiver in the National Football League (NFL).

References

External links
 

1973 births
Living people
American football wide receivers
New York Jets players
Pittsburgh Steelers players
UNLV Rebels football players
Sportspeople from Suffolk, Virginia
Players of American football from Virginia